The 2009 Holy Cross Crusaders football team represented the College of the Holy Cross in the 2009 NCAA Division I FCS football season. They were led by sixth-year head coach Tom Gilmore and played their home games at Fitton Field. They were a member of the Patriot League. They finished the season 9–3, 5–1 in Patriot League play to finish in first place and won the conference title. They went to the FCS Playoffs where they lost to Villanova, 38–28.

Schedule

References

Holy Cross
Holy Cross Crusaders football seasons
Patriot League football champion seasons
Holy Cross Crusaders football